David "Dave" C. Chester (birth registered third ¼ 1946) is an English former rugby union and professional rugby league footballer who played in the 1970s.

Background
David Chester's birth was registered in Wakefield district, West Riding of Yorkshire, England.

Playing career

Club career
David Chester changed rugby football codes from rugby union to rugby league when he transferred from Orrell R.U.F.C. to Warrington during September 1972, he made his début for Warrington on Sunday 29 October 1972, he played his last match for Warrington during the 1972–73 season, he made his début for Wakefield Trinity during April 1975, and he played his last match for Wakefield Trinity during the 1975–76 season.

Genealogical information
David Chester is the son of the rugby union and rugby league footballer; Charles Chester

References

External links
Search for "Chester" at rugbyleagueproject.org
Statistics at wolvesplayers.thisiswarrington.co.uk

1946 births
Living people
English rugby league players
Huddersfield Giants players
Keighley Cougars players
Place of birth missing (living people)
Rugby league players from Wakefield
Rugby league props
Wakefield Trinity players
Warrington Wolves players